Quiet Cool is a 1986 American action film directed and co-written by Clay Borris, and starring James Remar, Adam Coleman Howard, Daphne Ashbrook, Jared Martin, Nick Cassavetes and Fran Ryan.

Plot

Joe Dylanne is a plain-clothes NYC cop with a badge and a robust personality. He always resorts to unconventional methods in order to capture the city's slickest criminals. When Dylanne receives a message from Katy, an old sweetheart of his, the news is not as pleasant as he anticipated. Rather, it is an imperative call for help. Dylanne must swing into full action. This cop must travel to a remote location in the northwest in order to investigate the disappearances of his friend's relatives. It turns out that most of Kate's relatives have been murdered in cold blood. The only survivor of the slaughter is Joshua, an angst-ridden survivalist who explains to Dylanne about a sophisticated plan implicating marijuana plant growers. Dylanne and Joshua must trespass enemy territory in the name of revenge.

Cast
 James Remar as Officer Joe Dylanne
 Adam Coleman Howard as Joshua Greer
 Daphne Ashbrook as Katy Greer
 Jared Martin as Mike Prior
 Nick Cassavetes as Valence
 Joey Sagal as Toker
 Chris Mulkey as 'Red'
 Clayton Landey as Cairo
 Brooks Gardner as 'Pink'
 Fran Ryan as Ma
 Ted White as Ellis
 Rob Moran as Briggs
 Travis McKenna as 'Handlebar'

References

External links
 
 

1986 films
1986 action films
1980s English-language films
Films directed by Clay Borris